Luke The Drifter Jr. – Vol. 2 is the twelfth studio album by American musician Hank Williams Jr. The album was issued by MGM Records as number SE 4632 and later reissued by Polydor Records as number 831 576-1 Y-1.

Track listing

Side one
 "Custody" (Steve Karlinski, Larry Kolber) – 2:25
 "Just Waitin'" (Hank Williams, Bob Cazzaway) – 2:49
 "Beyond the Sunset" (B. Brock, Virgil P. Brock, Roswell) – 3:14
 "The Chair That Rocked Us All" (Jerry Chestnut) – 2:26
 "These Men Who Never Sleep" (Vincent Matthews) – 2:24
 "A Picture from Life's Other Side" (Hank Williams) – 2:00

Side two
 "Be Careful of Stones That You Throw" (Bonnie Dodd) – 3:01
 "Life Gets Tee-Jus Don't It" (Carson J. Robison) – 3:30
 "Does Your Mama Know You're Here" (Bob Hampton) – 1:53
 "I've Been Down That Road Before" (Hank Williams) – 3:20
 "Too Many Parties and Too Many Pals" (Ray Henderson, Billy Rose, Mort Dixon) – 2:46

External links
 Hank Williams Jr's official website

1969 albums
Hank Williams Jr. albums
Albums arranged by Bill McElhiney
MGM Records albums
Polydor Records albums